Patrick Beaudouin (born 7 April 1953) is a member of the National Assembly of France. He represents the Val-de-Marne department, and is a member of the Union for a Popular Movement.

References

1953 births
Living people
People from Eure
Rally for the Republic politicians
The Republicans (France) politicians
The Popular Right
Mayors of places in Île-de-France
Politicians from Île-de-France
Deputies of the 12th National Assembly of the French Fifth Republic
Deputies of the 13th National Assembly of the French Fifth Republic